Gourma is one of the 45 provinces of Burkina Faso, in Est Region. The capital of Gourma is Fada N’Gourma. The population of Gourma was 437,242 in 2019.

Departments
Gourma is divided into 6 departments:

See also
Regions of Burkina Faso
Provinces of Burkina Faso
Departments of Burkina Faso

References

 
Provinces of Burkina Faso